There are many $5 banknotes, bills or coins, including:
 Australian five-dollar note
 Canadian five-dollar note
 New Zealand five-dollar note
 United States five-dollar bill
 Hong Kong five-dollar coin
 Hong Kong five-dollar note

Other currencies that issue $5 banknotes, bills or coins are:

See also
 "5 dols", a 2018 song by Christine and the Queens, simultaneously released in English as "5 Dollars"